Lemuel Carpenter (c. 1808 in Kentucky – November 5, 1859 in California) was one of the first Anglo-American settlers of what is now the Los Angeles, California metropolitan area.

Early life
Lemuel Carpenter was born c. 1808 in Kentucky.  He migrated to Missouri about 1828, where he served in Searcy's Company of Missouri Militia in 1829.

Southern California Pioneer
Carpenter was in southern California by January 1833, arriving in the company of trappers Cyrus Alexander, William Chard, Joseph Paulding, and Albert Toomes.  Early California settler John Bidwell includes him in this recollection of people he knew in the Pueblo de Los Ángeles: "Los Angeles I first saw in March, 1845. It then had probably two hundred and fifty people, of whom I recall Don Abel Stearns, John Temple (Jonathan Temple), Captain Alexander Bell, William Wolfskill, Lemuel Carpenter, David W. Alexander; also of Mexicans, Pío Pico (governor), Don Juan Bandini, and others".

Carpenter started a soap manufacturing business ("jabonería") at Chokishgna, a Tongva-Gabrieleño village on the San Gabriel River in present-day El Monte that profited sufficiently for him to purchase Rancho Santa Gertrudes, which included the Tongva village Nacaugna, now Downey, California, southeast of what is now downtown Los Angeles.

He was among the first of the Americans to plant a vineyard for the making of wine.

His original settlement was known as "Carpenter's Farm" from 1837 until it was destroyed by a flood in 1867.  He was active in revolutionary activities, sided with the Americans in the Mexican War, tried gold mining, and in general prospered in his new home. A popular travel guide notes: "Rancho Santa Gertrudes…was sold to Lemuel Carpenter, a Kentuckian, who married the beautiful María de los Angeles Domínguez. ... The Carpenters [were] happy and prosperous under Mexican rule".

Rancho Santa Gertrudes was owned by Lemuel Carpenter until 1859.  In 1859 the rancho was sold at sheriff's auction to John G. Downey and James P. McFarland. "Samuel", actually "Lemuel" but misspelled by the recorder, Carpenter was recorded as the legal possessor as late as 1862.

Family
Lemuel's father is believed to be Jonathan Carpenter (c. 1785 Virginia-c. 1853 Missouri) and grandson of Matthew Carpenter (c. 1761 Virginia-c. 1798 Virginia).

In the 1850 census, Lemuel Carpenter is listed as age 42, with a real estate value of $8,000 dollars, a farmer.  His wife, Maria, is listed as age 22 — she was his second wife.  His children, all born in California, are listed as:
 Susana Carpenter, age 11.
 José Antonio Carpenter, age 9 (born November 20, 1837; descendants still live in Los Angeles)
 Refugio Carpenter, age 6.
 Francisco Carpenter, age 3.

Misfortune and Death
Carpenter's prosperity took a precipitous downturn when a $5,000 loan from John G. Downey taken out in 1852 ballooned into a $104,000 debt by 1859. Unable to repay the debt, he eventually killed himself.

The diary of Lemuel Carpenter's daughter Mary Refugio Carpenter includes this entry written on January 2, 1861: "I have been thinking so much of my father tonight.  It made me weep."

References and notes

American pioneers
California pioneers
People of Mexican California
People of the American Old West
1800s births
1859 deaths
People from Los Angeles
History of Los Angeles
History of Los Angeles County, California
19th-century American people
19th century in Los Angeles
Year of birth uncertain
Suicides by firearm in California